This is an alphabetical list of writers who are Japanese, or are famous for having written in the Japanese language. 

Writers are listed by the native order of Japanese names, family name followed by given name to ensure consistency although some writers are known by their western-ordered name.

See also
 Japanese literature
 List of Japanese women writers
 List of Japanese people
 List of novelists
 Lists of authors